The 1971 Dixie 500 was a NASCAR Winston Cup Series racing event that took place on August 1, 1971, at Atlanta International Raceway in Hampton, Georgia.

Background
Atlanta International Raceway (now Atlanta Motor Speedway) is one of ten current intermediate tracks to hold NASCAR races; the others are Charlotte Motor Speedway, Chicagoland Speedway, Darlington Raceway, Homestead Miami Speedway, Kansas Speedway, Kentucky Speedway, Las Vegas Motor Speedway, New Hampshire Motor Speedway, and Texas Motor Speedway. However, at the time, only Charlotte, Darlington, and New Hampshire were built.

The track's turns are banked at twenty-four degrees, while the front stretch, the location of the finish line, and the back stretch are banked at five.

Race report
Elmo Langley received the last-place finish due to an engine issue on lap 36 of 328, while Richard Petty defeated Bobby Allison by 2 car lengths in front of 22500 live spectators. Five cautions slowed the race for 48 laps; making the race last three hours and fifty-two minutes in length.

Dave Marcis had problems with his vehicle's suspension on lap 38 while Raymond Williams' vehicle had a faulty transmission on lap 40. Dub Simpson blew his vehicle's engine on lap 60. Ed Negre wrecked his vehicle's transmission on lap 62. Coo Coo Marlin would over-exhaust his engine on lap 82 while Charlie Roberts did the same thing on lap 90. The suspension on Neil Castles' vehicle stopped working on lap 92. Bill Dennis' vehicle had some serious vibration issues on lap 131 while Paul Tyler's engine blew on lap 149. Further engine problems occurred on lap 231 with Buddy Baker, lap 249 with Pete Hamilton, lap 264 with Earl Brooks, and lap 302 with Bobby Brack.

Friday Hassler gets his third top six finish in a row less than a month after driving the Junior Johnson Chevy to victory at Bristol in relief of Charlie Glotzbach.

Richard Petty officially became a millionaire after this race; bringing his career earnings to approximately $1,000,000 ($ when adjusted for inflation). This would be the last time a driver won 5 races in a row, in any series, until 2009 when Ron Hornaday won five in a row in the 2009 NASCAR Camping World Truck Series season. Petty's five consecutive wins during the 1971 NASCAR Winston Cup Series season is considered to be the equivalent of Sebastian Vettel winning nine races in a row at the end of the 2013 Formula One World Championship. Dick Poling would retire from the NASCAR Cup Series after finishing in 26th place during this race.

Notable crew chiefs who fully participated in the race were Junie Donlavey, Harry Hyde, Dale Inman, Vic Ballard, Lee Gordon, and John Green.

The race car drivers still had to commute to the races using the same stock cars that competed in a typical weekend's race through a policy of homologation (and under their own power). This policy was in effect until roughly 1975. By 1980, NASCAR had completely stopped tracking the year model of all the vehicles and most teams did not take stock cars to the track under their own power anymore.

Qualifying

Finishing order
Section reference: 

 Richard Petty (#43)
 Bobby Allison (#12)
 Benny Parsons (#72)
 Charlie Glotzbach (#3)
 Friday Hassler (#39)
 Donnie Allison (#21)
 Ron Keselowski (#88)
 Frank Warren (#79)
 James Hylton (#48)
 Bill Champion (#10)
 Richard D. Brown (#91)
 Cecil Gordon (#24)
 Marty Robbins (#42)
 Jabe Thomas (#25)
 Bill Seifert (#25)
 Bobby Brack* (#53)
 J.D. McDuffie (#70)
 Walter Ballard (#30)
 Ben Arnold (#76)
 Henley Gray (#19)
 Wendell Scott (#34)
 Dick May (#5)
 Earl Brooks* (#36)
 Pete Hamilton* (#6)
 Buddy Baker* (#11)
 Dick Poling (#62)
 G.C. Spencer* (#49)
 Paul Tyler* (#95)
 John Sears* (#4)
 Bill Dennis* (#96)
 Neil Castles* (#06)
 Charlie Roberts* (#77)
 Bobby Isaac* (#71)
 Coo Coo Marlin* (#07)
 Joe Frasson* (#18)
 Ed Negre* (#8)
 Dub Simpson* (#93)
 Raymond Williams* (#47)
 Dave Marcis* (#2)
 Elmo Langley* (#64)

* Driver failed to finish race

References

Dixie 500
Dixie 500
NASCAR races at Atlanta Motor Speedway